Sverigeleden (in English, the "Sweden route") is a connected network of 15 main long-distance cycling routes across Sweden and a further 24 branches. Together this network forms the national cycling route network of Sweden. The  Sverigeleden was largely established to promote bicycle tourism.

The main routes of the Sverigeleden extend from Helsingborg in the south to Karesuando in the north and measures . The remaining sections form alternate branch routes which measure an additional . The routes are signposted with green signs by the Svenska Cykelsällskapet (Swedish Cycling Association) in co-operation with local roadworks authorities. The routes are mainly on lightly trafficked, paved roads in scenic areas.

See also
EuroVelo

References

External links
Sverigeleden, Svenska Cykelsällskapet (Swedish Cycling Association) 
Mapping project for Sverigeleden at OpenStreetMap

Cycling in Sweden
Cycleways in Sweden
National cycling route networks